Armenian (classical: , reformed: ,) is an Indo-European language and an independent branch of that family of languages. It is the official language of both Armenia and Artsakh, the latter of which is unrecognized by the United Nations but has recognition from 3 non-UN states. Historically spoken in the Armenian highlands, today Armenian is widely spoken throughout the Armenian diaspora. Armenian is written in its own writing system, the Armenian alphabet, introduced in 405 AD by the priest Mesrop Mashtots. The total number of Armenian speakers worldwide is estimated between 5 and 7 million.

History

Classification and origins

Armenian is an independent branch of the Indo-European languages. It is of interest to linguists for its distinctive phonological changes within that family. Armenian exhibits more satemization than centumization, although it is not classified as belonging to either of these subgroups. Some linguists tentatively conclude that Armenian, Greek (and Phrygian) and Indo-Iranian were dialectally close to each other; within this hypothetical dialect group, Proto-Armenian was situated between Proto-Greek (centum subgroup) and Proto-Indo-Iranian (satem subgroup). Ronald I. Kim has noted unique morphological developments connecting Armenian to Balto-Slavic languages.

Armenia was a monolingual country by the 2nd century BC at the latest. Its language has a long literary history, with a 5th-century Bible translation as its oldest surviving text. Its vocabulary has historically been influenced by Western Middle Iranian languages, particularly Parthian; its derivational morphology and syntax were also affected by language contact with Parthian, but to a lesser extent. Contact with Greek, Persian, and Syriac also resulted in a number of loanwords. There are two standardized modern literary forms, Eastern Armenian and Western Armenian, with which most contemporary dialects are mutually intelligible.

Although Armenians were known to history much earlier (for example, they were mentioned in the 6th-century BC Behistun Inscription and in Xenophon's 4th century BC history, The Anabasis), the oldest surviving Armenian-language writing is etched in stone on Armenian temples and is called Mehenagir. The Armenian alphabet was created by Mesrop Mashtots in 405, at which time it had 36 letters. He is also credited by some with the creation of the Georgian alphabet and the Caucasian Albanian alphabet.

While Armenian constitutes the sole member of the Armenian branch of the Indo-European family, Aram Kossian has suggested that the hypothetical Mushki language may have been a (now extinct) Armenic language.

Early contacts
W. M. Austin (1942) concluded that there was early contact between Armenian and Anatolian languages, based on what he considered common archaisms, such as the lack of a feminine gender and the absence of inherited long vowels. However, unlike shared innovations (or synapomorphies), the common retention of archaisms (or symplesiomorphy) is not considered conclusive evidence of a period of common isolated development. There are words used in Armenian that are generally believed to have been borrowed from Anatolian languages, particularly from Luwian, although some researchers have identified possible Hittite loanwords as well. One notable loanword from Anatolian is Armenian xalam, "skull", cognate to Hittite ḫalanta, "head".

In 1985, the Soviet linguist Igor M. Diakonoff noted the presence in Classical Armenian of what he calls a "Caucasian substratum" identified by earlier scholars, consisting of loans from the Kartvelian and Northeast Caucasian languages. Noting that Hurro-Urartian-speaking peoples inhabited the Armenian homeland in the second millennium BC, Diakonoff identifies in Armenian a Hurro-Urartian substratum of social, cultural, and animal and plant terms such as ałaxin "slave girl" ( ← Hurr. al(l)a(e)ḫḫenne), cov "sea" ( ← Urart. ṣûǝ "(inland) sea"), ułt "camel" ( ← Hurr. uḷtu), and xnjor "apple (tree)" ( ← Hurr. ḫinzuri). Some of the terms he gives admittedly have an Akkadian or Sumerian provenance, but he suggests they were borrowed through Hurrian or Urartian. Given that these borrowings do not undergo sound changes characteristic of the development of Armenian from Proto-Indo-European, he dates their borrowing to a time before the written record but after the Proto-Armenian language stage.

Contemporary linguists, such as Hrach Martirosyan, have rejected many of the Hurro-Urartian and Northeast Caucasian origins for these words and instead suggest native Armenian etymologies, leaving the possibility that these words may have been loaned into Hurro-Urartian and Caucasian languages from Armenian, and not vice versa. A notable example is arciv, meaning "eagle," believed to have been the origin of Urartian Arṣibi and Northeast Caucasian  arzu. This word is derived from Proto-Indo-European *h₂r̥ǵipyós, with cognates in Sanskrit (ऋजिप्य, ṛjipyá), Avestan (erezef), and Greek (αἰγίπιος, aigípios). Hrach Martirosyan and Armen Petrosyan propose additional borrowed words of Armenian origin loaned into Urartian and vice versa, including grammatical words and parts of speech, such as Urartian eue ("and"), attested in the earliest Urartian texts and likely a loan from Armenian (compare to Armenian  , ultimately from Proto-Indo-European *h₁epi). Other loans from Armenian into Urartian includes personal names, toponyms, and names of deities.

Loan words from Iranian languages, along with the other ancient accounts such as that of Xenophon above, initially led linguists to erroneously classify Armenian as an Iranian language. Scholars such as Paul de Lagarde and F. Müller believed that the similarities between the two languages meant that Armenian belonged to the Iranian language family. The distinctness of Armenian was recognized when philologist Heinrich Hübschmann (1875) used the comparative method to distinguish two layers of Iranian words from the older Armenian vocabulary. He showed that Armenian often had two morphemes for one concept, that the non-Iranian components yielded a consistent Proto-Indo-European pattern distinct from Iranian, and that the inflectional morphology was different from that of Iranian languages.

Graeco-Armenian hypothesis

The hypothesis that Greek is Armenian's closest living relative originates with Holger Pedersen (1924), who noted that the number of Greek-Armenian lexical cognates is greater than that of agreements between Armenian and any other Indo-European language. Antoine Meillet (1925, 1927) further investigated morphological and phonological agreement and postulated that the parent languages of Greek and Armenian were dialects in immediate geographical proximity during the Proto-Indo-European period. Meillet's hypothesis became popular in the wake of his book Esquisse d'une histoire de la langue latine (1936). Georg Renatus Solta (1960) does not go as far as postulating a Proto-Graeco-Armenian stage, but he concludes that considering both the lexicon and morphology, Greek is clearly the dialect to be most closely related to Armenian. Eric P. Hamp (1976, 91) supports the Graeco-Armenian thesis and even anticipates a time "when we should speak of Helleno-Armenian" (meaning the postulate of a Graeco-Armenian proto-language). Armenian shares the augment and a negator derived from the set phrase in the Proto-Indo-European language  ("never anything" or "always nothing"), the representation of word-initial laryngeals by prothetic vowels, and other phonological and morphological peculiarities with Greek. Nevertheless, as Fortson (2004) comments, "by the time we reach our earliest Armenian records in the 5th century AD, the evidence of any such early kinship has been reduced to a few tantalizing pieces".

Greco-Armeno-Aryan hypothesis

Graeco-(Armeno)-Aryan is a hypothetical clade within the Indo-European family, ancestral to the Greek language, the Armenian language, and the Indo-Iranian languages.  Graeco-Aryan unity would have become divided into Proto-Greek and Proto-Indo-Iranian by the mid-3rd millennium BC. Conceivably, Proto-Armenian would have been located between Proto-Greek and Proto-Indo-Iranian, consistent with the fact that Armenian shares certain features only with Indo-Iranian (the satem change) but others only with Greek (s > h).

Graeco-Aryan has comparatively wide support among Indo-Europeanists who believe the Indo-European homeland to be located in the Armenian Highlands, the "Armenian hypothesis". Early and strong evidence was given by Euler's 1979 examination on shared features in Greek and Sanskrit nominal flection.

Used in tandem with the Graeco-Armenian hypothesis, the Armenian language would also be included under the label Aryano-Greco-Armenic, splitting into Proto-Greek/Phrygian and "Armeno-Aryan" (ancestor of Armenian and Indo-Iranian).

Evolution

Classical Armenian (Arm: grabar), attested from the 5th century to the 19th century as the literary standard (up to the 11th century also as a spoken language with different varieties), was partially superseded by Middle Armenian, attested from the 12th century to the 18th century. Specialized literature prefers "Old Armenian" for grabar as a whole, and designates as "Classical" the language used in the 5th century literature, "Post-Classical" from the late 5th to 8th centuries, and "Late Grabar" that of the period covering the 8th to 11th centuries. Later, it was used mainly in religious and specialized literature, with the exception of a revival during the early modern period, when attempts were made to establish it as the language of a literary renaissance, with neoclassical inclinations, through the creation and dissemination of literature in varied genres, especially by the Mekhitarists. The first Armenian periodical, Azdarar, was published in grabar in 1794.

The classical form borrowed numerous words from Middle Iranian languages, primarily Parthian, and contains smaller inventories of loanwords from Greek, Syriac, Aramaic, Arabic, Mongol, Persian, and indigenous languages such as Urartian. An effort to modernize the language in Bagratid Armenia and the Armenian Kingdom of Cilicia (11–14th centuries) resulted in the addition of two more characters to the alphabet ("" and ""), bringing the total number to 38.

The Book of Lamentations by Gregory of Narek (951–1003) is an example of the development of a literature and writing style of Old Armenian by the 10th century. In addition to elevating the literary style and vocabulary of the Armenian language by adding well above a thousand new words, through his other hymns and poems Gregory paved the way for his successors to include secular themes and vernacular language in their writings. The thematic shift from mainly religious texts to writings with secular outlooks further enhanced and enriched the vocabulary. “A Word of Wisdom”, a poem by Hovhannes Sargavak devoted to a starling, legitimizes poetry devoted to nature, love, or female beauty. Gradually, the interests of the population at large were reflected in other literary works as well. Konsdantin Yerzinkatsi and several others even take the unusual step of criticizing the ecclesiastic establishment and addressing the social issues of the Armenian homeland. However, these changes represented the nature of the literary style and syntax, but they did not constitute immense changes to the fundamentals of the grammar or the morphology of the language. Often, when writers codify a spoken dialect, other language users are then encouraged to imitate that structure through the literary device known as parallelism.

In the 19th century, the traditional Armenian homeland was once again divided. This time Eastern Armenia was conquered from Qajar Iran by the Russian Empire, while Western Armenia, containing two thirds of historical Armenia, remained under Ottoman control. The antagonistic relationship between the Russian and Ottoman empires led to creation of two separate and different environments under which Armenians lived. Halfway through the 19th century, two important concentrations of Armenian communities were further consolidated. Because of persecutions or the search for better economic opportunities, many Armenians living under Ottoman rule gradually moved to Istanbul, whereas Tbilisi became the center of Armenians living under Russian rule. These two cosmopolitan cities very soon became the primary poles of Armenian intellectual and cultural life.

The introduction of new literary forms and styles, as well as many new ideas sweeping Europe, reached Armenians living in both regions. This created an ever-growing need to elevate the vernacular, Ashkharhabar, to the dignity of a modern literary language, in contrast to the now-anachronistic Grabar. Numerous dialects existed in the traditional Armenian regions, which, different as they were, had certain morphological and phonetic features in common. On the basis of these features two major standards emerged:
 Western standard: The influx of immigrants from different parts of the traditional Armenian homeland to Istanbul crystallized the common elements of the regional dialects, paving the way for a style of writing that required a shorter and more flexible learning curve than Grabar.
 Eastern standard: The Yerevan dialect provided the primary elements of Eastern Armenian, centered in Tbilisi, Georgia. Similar to the Western Armenian variant, the Modern Eastern was in many ways more practical and accessible to the masses than Grabar.

Both centers vigorously pursued the promotion of Ashkharhabar. The proliferation of newspapers in both versions (Eastern & Western) and the development of a network of schools where modern Armenian was taught, dramatically increased the rate of literacy (in spite of the obstacles by the colonial administrators), even in remote rural areas. The emergence of literary works entirely written in the modern versions increasingly legitimized the language's existence. By the turn of the 20th century both varieties of the one modern Armenian language prevailed over Grabar and opened the path to a new and simplified grammatical structure of the language in the two different cultural spheres. Apart from several morphological, phonetic, and grammatical differences, the largely common vocabulary and generally analogous rules of grammatical fundamentals allows users of one variant to understand the other as long as they are fluent in one of the literary standards.

After World War I, the existence of the two modern versions of the same language was sanctioned even more clearly. The Armenian Soviet Socialist Republic (1920–1990) used Eastern Armenian as its official language, whereas the diaspora created after the Armenian genocide preserved the Western Armenian dialect.

The two modern literary dialects, Western (originally associated with writers in the Ottoman Empire) and Eastern (originally associated with writers in the Russian Empire), removed almost all of their Turkish lexical influences in the 20th century, primarily following the Armenian genocide.

Geographic distribution
The number of Armenian-speakers by country according to official government sources, including censuses and estimates:

Phonology

Proto-Indo-European voiceless stop consonants are aspirated in the Proto-Armenian language, one of the circumstances that is often linked to the glottalic theory, a version of which postulated that some voiceless occlusives of Proto-Indo-European were aspirated.

Stress

Vowels

Modern Armenian has six monophthongs. Each vowel phoneme in the table is represented by three symbols. The first is the sounds transcription in the International Phonetic Alphabet (IPA). After that appears the corresponding letter of the Armenian alphabet. The last symbol is its Latin transliteration.

 Western and other dialects may also have /, /.

Consonants
The following table lists the Eastern Armenian consonantal system. The occlusives and affricates have an aspirated series, commonly transcribed with a reversed apostrophe after the letter. Each phoneme in the table is represented by IPA, Armenian script and romanization.

The major phonetic difference between dialects is in the reflexes of Classical Armenian voice-onset time. The seven dialect types have the following correspondences, illustrated with the t–d series:
{| class="wikitable" style=text-align:center
|+Correspondence in initial position
!Armenian Letter
|Թ
|Տ
|Դ
|-
!Indo-European
|*
|*
|*
|-
!Karin, Sebastia
| rowspan="7" |
|
| rowspan="2" |
|-
!Yerevan
|
|-
!Istanbul
|colspan=2|
|-
!Kharberd, Middle Armenian
| rowspan="2" |
|
|-
!Malatya, SWA
|
|-
!Classical Armenian, Agulis, SEA
|
|
|-
!Van, Artsakh
|colspan=2|
|}

Morphology

Armenian corresponds with other Indo-European languages in its structure, but it shares distinctive sounds and features of its grammar with neighboring languages of the Caucasus region. The Armenian orthography is rich in combinations of consonants, but in pronunciation, this is broken up with schwas. Both classical Armenian and the modern spoken and literary dialects have a complicated system of noun declension, with six or seven noun cases but no gender. In modern Armenian, the use of auxiliary verbs to show tense (comparable to will in "he will go") has generally supplemented the inflected verbs of Classical Armenian. Negative verbs are conjugated differently from positive ones (as in English "he goes" and "he does not go") in many tenses, otherwise adding only the negative  to the positive conjugation. Grammatically, early forms of Armenian had much in common with classical Greek and Latin, but the modern language, like modern Greek, has undergone many transformations, adding some analytic features.

Noun
Classical Armenian has no grammatical gender, not even in the pronoun, but there is a feminine suffix ( "-uhi"). For example,  (usucʻičʻ, "teacher") becomes  (usucʻčʻuhi, female teacher). This suffix, however, does not have a grammatical effect on the sentence. The nominal inflection, however, preserves several types of inherited stem classes. Historically, nouns were declined for one of seven cases: nominative (ուղղական uġġakan), accusative (հայցական haycʻakan), locative (ներգոյական nergoyakan), genitive (սեռական seṙakan), dative (տրական trakan), ablative (բացառական bacʻaṙakan), or instrumental (գործիական gorciakan), but in the modern language, the nominative and accusative cases, as well as the dative and genitive cases have merged.

Examples of noun declension in Eastern Armenian

Which case the direct object takes is split based on animacy (a phenomen more generally known as differential object marking). Inanimate nouns take the nominative, while animate nouns take the dative. Additionally, animate nouns can never take the locative case.

Examples of noun declension in Western Armenian

Verb

Verbs in Armenian have an expansive system of conjugation with two main verb types in Eastern Armenian and three in Western Armenian changing form based on tense, mood and aspect.

Dialects

Armenian is a pluricentric language, having two modern standardized forms: Eastern Armenian and Western Armenian. The most distinctive feature of Western Armenian is that it has undergone several phonetic mergers; these may be due to proximity to Arabic- and Turkish-speaking communities.

Classical Armenian (Grabar), which remained the standard until the 18th century, was quite homogeneous across the different regions that works in it were written; it may have been a cross-regional standard. The Middle Armenian variety used in the court of Cilician Armenia (1080–1375) provides a window into the development of Western Armenian, which came to be based on what became the dialect of Istanbul, while the standard for Eastern Armenian was based on the dialect around Mount Ararat and Yerevan. Although the Armenian language is often divided into "east" and "west", the two standards are actually relatively close to each other in light of wealth of the diversity present among regional non-standard Armenian dialects. The different dialects have experienced different degrees of language contact effects, often with Turkic and Caucasian languages; for some, the result has been  significant phonological and syntactic changes. Fortson notes that the modern standard as well has now attained a subordinate clausal structure that greatly resembles a Turkic language.

Western Armenian has simplified the occlusive system into a simple division between voiced occlusives and aspirated ones; the first series corresponds to the tenuis series of Eastern Armenian, and the second corresponds to the Eastern voiced and aspirated series.

There is no precise linguistic border between one dialect and another because there is nearly always a dialect transition zone of some size between pairs of geographically identified dialects.

Armenian can be divided into two major dialectal blocks and those blocks into individual dialects, though many of the Western Armenian dialects have become extinct due to the effects of the Armenian genocide. In addition, neither dialect is completely homogeneous: any dialect can be subdivided into several subdialects. Although Western and Eastern Armenian are often described as different dialects of the same language, many subdialects are not readily mutually intelligible. Nevertheless, a fluent speaker of one of two greatly varying dialects who is also literate in one of the standards, when exposed to the other dialect for a period of time will be able to understand the other with relative ease.

Distinct Western Armenian varieties currently in use include Homshetsi, spoken by the Hemshin peoples; the dialects of Armenians of Kessab (Քեսապի բարբառ), Latakia and Jisr al-Shughur (Syria), Anjar, Lebanon, and Vakıflı, Samandağ (Turkey), part of the "Sueidia" dialect (Սուէտիայի բարբառ).

Forms of the Karin dialect of Western Armenian are spoken by several hundred thousand people in Northern Armenia, mostly in Gyumri, Artik, Akhuryan, and around 130 villages in Shirak Province, and by Armenians in Samtskhe–Javakheti province of Georgia (Akhalkalaki, Akhaltsikhe).

Nakhichevan-on-Don Armenians speak another Western Armenian variety based on the dialect of Armenians in Crimea, where they came from in order to establish the town and surrounding villages in 1779 (Նոր Նախիջևանի բարբառ).

Western Armenian dialects are currently spoken also in Gavar (formerly Nor Bayazet and Kamo, on the west of Lake Sevan), Aparan, and Talin in Armenia (Mush dialect), and by the large Armenian population residing in Abkhazia, where they are considered to be the first or second ethnic minority, or even equal in number to the local Abkhaz population

Orthography

The Armenian alphabet ( or ) is a graphically unique alphabetical writing system that is used to write the Armenian language. It was introduced around AD 405 by Mesrop Mashtots, an Armenian linguist and ecclesiastical leader, and originally contained 36 letters. Two more letters, օ (ō) and ֆ (f), were added in the Middle Ages.

During the 1920s orthography reform in Soviet Armenia, a new letter և (capital ԵՎ) was added, which was a ligature before ե+ւ, whereas the letter Ւ ւ was discarded and reintroduced as part of a new letter ՈՒ ու (which was a digraph before). This alphabet and associated orthography is used by most Armenian speakers of Armenia and the countries of the former Soviet Union. Neither the alphabet nor the orthography has been adopted by Diaspora Armenians, including Eastern Armenian speakers of Iran and all Western Armenian speakers, who keep using the traditional alphabet and spelling.

Vocabulary

Indo-European cognates
Armenian is an Indo-European language, so many of its Proto-Indo-European-descended words are cognates of words in other Indo-European languages such as English, Latin, Greek, and Sanskrit.

However, due to extensive loaning, only around 1,500 words (G. Jahukyan) are known to have been inherited from Indo-European by the Classical Armenian stage; the rest were lost, a fact that presents a major challenge to endeavors to better understand Proto-Armenian and its place within the family, especially as many of the sound changes along the way from Indo-European to Armenian remain quite difficult to analyze.

This table lists some of the more recognizable cognates that Armenian shares with English words descended from Old English.

See also

 Armenian PowerSpell, electronic text corrector
 Armenian Sign Language
 Languages of Armenia
 Language families and languages
 List of Indo-European languages
 Classical Armenian orthography
 Auguste Carrière

Notes

Footnotes

References

Further reading

 Adjarian, Hrachya H. (1909) Classification des dialectes arméniens, par H. Adjarian. Paris: Honoré Champion.
 Clackson, James. 1994. The Linguistic Relationship Between Armenian and Greek. London: Publications of the Philological Society, No 30. (and Oxford: Blackwell Publishing)
 Holst, Jan Henrik (2009) Armenische Studien. Wiesbaden: Harrassowitz.
 Mallory, J. P. (1989) In Search of the Indo-Europeans: Language, Archaeology and Myth. London: Thames & Hudson.
 
 Vaux, Bert. 1998. The Phonology of Armenian. Oxford: Clarendon Press.
 Vaux, Bert. 2002. "The Armenian dialect of Jerusalem." in Armenians in the Holy Land. Louvain: Peters.

External links
 Armenian Lessons  (free online through the Linguistics Research Center at UT Austin)
 Armenian Swadesh list of basic vocabulary words (from Wiktionary's Swadesh list appendix)
 ARMENIA AND IRAN iv. History, discussion, and the presentation of Iranian influences in Armenian Language over the millennia
 Nayiri.com (Library of Armenian dictionaries)
 dictionaries.arnet.am Collection of Armenian XDXF and Stardict dictionaries
 Grabar (Brief introduction to Classical Armenian also known as Grabar)
 բառարան.հայ – Armenian dictionary

Indo-European languages
 
 
Subject–object–verb languages
Languages of Armenia
Languages of Russia
Languages of Turkey
Languages of Kazakhstan
Languages of Iran
Languages of Lebanon
Languages of Azerbaijan
Languages of Georgia (country)
Languages of the Caucasus
Languages of Cyprus
Languages attested from the 5th century
Languages of Kurdistan
Articles containing video clips